Welsh singer Bonnie Tyler has released one video album and has appeared in numerous music videos, television shows, television commercials and in one film. While Tyler was signed to RCA Records between 1976 and 1981, she released three music videos for "Lost in France", "It's a Heartache" and "Sitting On the Edge of the Ocean". She also filmed three videos for the first and second season of The Kenny Everett Video Show. 

Tyler's fifth album Faster Than the Speed of Night (1983) spawned the single "Total Eclipse of the Heart", whose music video was filmed at Holloway Sanatorium. Directed by Russel Mulcahy, it depicts Tyler as a high school teacher fantasizing about her students. She also released videos for "Have You Ever Seen the Rain", "Faster Than the Speed of Night" and "Take Me Back". In 1984, Tyler recorded "Holding Out for a Hero" for the Footloose soundtrack, and filmed a video at the Grand Canyon in Arizona, directed by Doug Dowdle. She also filmed a video for "A Rockin' Good Way (to Mess Around and Fall in Love)" with Shakin' Stevens. Her 1985 music video for "Loving You's a Dirty Job (but Somebody's Gotta Do It)" is based on a couple fighting. It was recorded as a duet between Tyler and Todd Rundgren, and features Welsh actor Hywel Bennett miming his lines. In 1986, Tyler filmed a video for her single "If You Were a Woman (And I Was a Man)" which received six nominations at the 1986 Billboard Video Music Conference.

In 1986, Tyler released her first and only video album The Video, featuring eight music videos from her CBS years. "The Best" became her final video with CBS in 1988. Tyler continued to release videos in the 1990s; four with Hansa and one with EastWest. Since the 2000s, Tyler has released music videos less frequently, including "Si demain... (Turn Around)" with Kareen Antonn, "Louise" in 2005, "Believe in Me" in 2013 and "Love's Holding On" with Axel Rudi Pell in 2017.

Tyler has appeared in only one film, singing the title song for The World Is Full of Married Men in 1979 during the opening credits. In 2005, BBC One Wales produced a documentary of Tyler's career titled In One Voice, which focused on her recordings in the 70s and 80s, and her album Wings (2005). Tyler has made several acting roles on television, including Three of a Kind in 1983, on French comedy sketch show Y a-t-il encore un coco dans le show ? in 1990, and Hollyoaks Later in 2009. She has also appeared in two television commercials.

Music videos

Guest appearances

Video albums

Filmography

Films

Television 

AAdditional footage of Tyler was also released on the 2009 DVD The Best of Never Mind the Buzzcocks.

Commercials

Home media

References

External links 

Bonnie Tyler's official Vevo channel on YouTube

Videography
Videographies of British artists